

Co-ownership

References
general
 
specific

Italy
Trans
2006